Margot Abad was an Argentine film actress during the golden age of Argentine cinema. She performed with Luis Sandrini, Santiago Gómez Cou, Olinda Bozán, Vicente Rubino, Lolita Torres, and Héctor Quintanilla.

Filmography
 1945: La Amada Inmóvil

References

Argentine film actresses
Year of birth missing
Year of death missing